Rashanda McCants (born November 17, 1986) is an American former professional women's basketball player in the Women's National Basketball Association. Her brother is Rashad McCants, who also played professional basketball.

Personal life
Rashanda Chanee’ McCants is the daughter of James and Brenda McCants. Her older brother, Rashad McCants, played in the National Basketball Association.

High school
McCants played for Asheville High School in Asheville, North Carolina. McCants was an All-America selection by McDonald's. She and her older brother, Rashad, are the first brother-sister duo to play in the McDonald's All-American Game.

College
As a freshman, McCants was an honorable mention selection for the ACC All-Freshman team. She appeared in 34 games, ranking fifth on the team in scoring.

In her sophomore campaign, McCants started all 38 games for the Tar Heels, establishing a new school record for games played and games started in a season. In her junior year, McCants averaged 15.8 points, 3.3 assists, and 6.6 rebounds per game. She was named to the All ACC second team.

In her senior season, McCants was named to the All-American, ACC Player of the Year, Naismith Watch List, Preseason Wooden List and Lowe's Senior CLASS Award Candidate. She was also a preseason Wade Watch List selection. She averaged 15 points and 6.5 rebounds per game.

WNBA career
McCants was drafted 15th (second round) overall in the WNBA draft to the Minnesota Lynx in 2009. She was later traded to the Tulsa Shock for Alexis Hornbuckle. McCants was waived by the Shock in June 2011.

WNBA career statistics

Regular season

|-
| align="left" | 2009
| align="left" | Minnesota
| 34 || 1 || 14.2 || .373 || .289 || .564 || 2.0 || 0.8 || 0.4 || 0.3 || 1.1 || 4.3
|-
| align="left" | 2010
| align="left" | Minnesota
| 17 || 4 || 15.8 || .393 || .297 || .621 || 2.4 || 0.9 || 0.6 || 0.1 || 0.8 || 5.6
|-
| align="left" | 2010
| align="left" | Tulsa
| 6 || 4 || 17.7 || .350 || .278 || .400 || 2.0 || 1.5 || 0.8 || 0.5 || 1.0 || 5.8
|-
| align="left" | Career
| align="left" | 3 years, 2 teams
| 57 || 9 || 15.0 || .376 || .290 || .575 || 2.1 || 0.9 || 0.5 || 0.3 || 1.0 || 4.8

College statistics
Source

References

External links
 WNBA Player Profile

1986 births
Living people
American women's basketball players
Basketball players from North Carolina
Forwards (basketball)
McDonald's High School All-Americans
Minnesota Lynx draft picks
Minnesota Lynx players
North Carolina Tar Heels women's basketball players
Parade High School All-Americans (girls' basketball)
Sportspeople from Asheville, North Carolina
Tulsa Shock players